Vienne is a town in southeastern France, located  south of Lyon, at the confluence of the Gère and the Rhône. It is the fourth largest-commune in the Isère department, of which it is a subprefecture alongside La Tour-du-Pin. Vienne was a major centre of the Roman Empire under the Latin name Vienna.

Before the arrival of the Roman armies, Vienne was the capital of the Allobroges, a Gallic people. Transformed into a Roman colony in 47 BC under Julius Caesar, Vienne became a major urban centre, ideally located along the Rhône, then a major axis of communication. Emperor Augustus banished Herod the Great's son, the ethnarch Herod Archelaus to Vienne in 6 AD.

The town became a Roman provincial capital and remains of Roman constructions are widespread across modern Vienne. It was also an important early bishopric in Christian Gaul. Its most famous bishop was Avitus of Vienne. At the Council of Vienne, which was convened there in October 1311, Pope Clement V abolished the order of the Knights Templar. During the Middle Ages, Vienne was part of the Kingdom of Provence, dependent on the Holy Roman Empire, and the opposite bank of the Rhône was French territory, which made it a strategic position.

The town is now a regional commercial and industrial centre, known regionally for its Saturday market. A Roman temple, circus pyramid and theatre (where the annual Jazz à Vienne is held), as well as museums (archaeological, textile industry) and notable Catholic buildings, make tourism an important part of the town's economy.

History

Roman Vienne

The oppidum of the Allobroges became a Roman colony about 47 BC under Julius Caesar, but the Allobroges managed to expel the Romans; the exiles then founded the colony of Lugdunum (today's Lyon). Ethnarch of Judea Herod Archelaus was exiled here in 6 AD. During the early Empire, Vienna (as the Romans called it—not to be confused with today's Vienna, then known as Vindobona) regained all its former privileges as a Roman colony. In 260 Postumus was proclaimed Emperor here of a short-lived Gallo-Roman Empire. Later it became a provincial capital of the Dioecesis Viennensis.

Vienne became the seat of the vicar of prefects after the creation of regional dioceses, of which the date is still controversial. Regional dioceses were created during the First Tetrarchy, 293–305, or possibly later as some recent studies suggest in 313, but no later than the Verona List, which is securely dated to June 314.

On the bank of the Gère are traces of the ramparts of the old Roman city, and on Mont Pipet (east of the town) are the remains of a Roman theatre, while the ruined thirteenth-century castle there was built on Roman footings. Several ancient aqueducts and traces of Roman roads can still be seen.

Two important Roman monuments still stand at Vienne. One is the Early Imperial Temple of Augustus and Livia, a rectangular peripteral building of the Corinthian order, erected by the emperor Claudius, which owes its survival, like the Maison Carrée at Nîmes, to being converted to a church soon after the Theodosian decrees and later rededicated as "Notre Dame de Vie." During the Revolutionary Reign of Terror it was used for the local Festival of Reason. The other is the Plan de l'Aiguille, a truncated pyramid resting on a portico with four arches, from the Roman circus. Legends from the 13th century mention Pontius Pilate's death in Vienne. Later legends held that the pyramid was either the tomb of Herod Archelaus or of Pontius Pilate.

The vestiges of a temple to Cybèle were discovered in 1945 when a new hospital was built on Mount Salomon and the Ancien Hôpital in the center of town was torn down.  Subsequent archaeological research conducted in 1965 permitted detailed reconstruction of the floor plan for the temple as well as the surrounding forum and established that the temple was constructed in the first century AD.

Christian Vienne

The provincial capital was an important early seat of a bishop and the legendary first bishop is said to have been Crescens, a disciple of Paul. There were Christians here in 177 when the churches of Vienne and Lyon addressed a letter to those of Asia and Phrygia, and mention is made of Sanctus, a deacon of Vienne (Eusebius of Caesarea, Church History). The first historical bishop was Verus, who was present at the Council of Arles (314). About 450, Vienne's bishops became archbishops, several of whom played an important cultural role, e.g. Mamertus, who established Rogation pilgrimages, and the poet, Avitus (498-518). Vienne's archbishops and those of Lyon disputed the title of "Primate of All the Gauls" based on the dates of founding of the cities compared to the dates of founding of the bishoprics. Vienne's archbishopric was suppressed in 1790, during the French Revolution and officially terminated 11 years later by the Concordat of 1801.

Burgundian Vienne
Vienne was a target during the Migration Period: it was taken by the Kingdom of the Burgundians in 438, but re-taken by the Romans and held until 461. In 534 the Merovingian-led Franks captured Vienne. It was then sacked by the Lombards in 558, and later by the Moors in 737. When Francia's king divided Frankish Burgundia into three parts in 843 by the Treaty of Verdun, Vienne became part of Middle Francia.

In the Kingdom of Provence
King Charles II the Bald assigned the Viennois district in 869 to Comte Boso of Provence, who in 879 proclaimed himself king of Provence and on his death in 887 was buried at Vienne in the cathedral church of St. Maurice. Vienne then continued as capital of the Dauphiné Vienne of the Kingdom of Provence, from 882 of the Kingdom of West Francia and from 933 of the Kingdom of Burgundy until in 1032, when it reverted to the Holy Roman Empire, but the real rulers were the archbishops of Vienne. Their rights were repeatedly recognized, but they had serious local rivals in the counts of Albon, and later Dauphins of the surrounding countship of the Viennois.  In 1349, the reigning Dauphin sold his rights to the Dauphiné to France, but the archbishop stood firm and Vienne was not included in this sale. The archbishops finally surrendered their territorial powers to France in 1449. Gui de Bourgogne, who was archbishop 1090–1119, was pope from 1119 to 1124 as Callixtus II.

The Council of Vienne was the fifteenth Ecumenical Council of the Roman Catholic Church that met between 1311 and 1312 in Vienne. Its principal act was to withdraw papal support for the Knights Templar on the instigation of Philip IV of France.

France

The archbishops did not give up their rights over it to France till 1449, when it first became French. Vienne was sacked in 1562 by the Protestants under the baron des Adrets, and was held for the Ligue 1590–95, when it was taken in the name of Henri IV by Montmorency. The fortifications were demolished between 1589 and 1636.

Industrial era
Train stations were built in Vienne in 1855 and in Estressin in 1875 providing freight transport to the textile and metallurgy industries, which had begun taking advantage of the water power in the valley of the river Gère in the previous centuries.

Population

Monuments
The two outstanding Roman remains in Vienne are the temple of Augustus and Livia, and the Plan de l'Aiguille or Pyramide, a truncated pyramid resting on a portico with four arches, which was associated with the city's Roman circus.

The early Romanesque church of Saint Peter belonged to an ancient Benedictine abbey and was rebuilt in the ninth century, with tall square piers and two ranges of windows in the tall aisles and a notable porch. It is one of France's oldest Christian buildings dating from the 5th century laid-out in the form of a basilica and having a large and well constructed nave. It also has a Romanesque tower and a sculptured South portal containing a statue of Saint Peter. Today, the building houses a lapidary museum that holds a Junon head and a statue of Tutela, the city's protective divinity.

The Gothic former cathedral of St Maurice was built between 1052 and 1533. It is a basilica, with three aisles and an apse, but no ambulatory or transepts. The most striking portion is the west front, which rises majestically from a terrace overhanging the Rhône. Its sculptural decoration was badly damaged by the Protestants in 1562 during the Wars of Religion.

The Romanesque church of St André en Bas was the church of a second Benedictine monastery, and became the chapel of the earlier kings of Provence. It was rebuilt in 1152, in the later Romanesque style.

Gallery

Notable people

Herod Archelaus (23 BC – ca.18 AD), ethnarch.
Pontius Pilate (according to legend)
Avitus of Vienne (450–ca.578), poet, bishop of Vienne and saint.
Boso of Provence, (ca.841–887), Carolingian king of Provence.
Pope Callixtus II (1065–1124), Archbishop of Vienne from 1088, Pope from 1119.
Michael Servetus (1509–1553), savant, burned as a heretic.
Nicolas Chorier (1612–1692), lawyer, historian, author.
Jean-François Leriget de La Faye (1674–1731) a diplomat, wealthy landowner, art collector and poet.
 (1733–1814), archeologist, artist, curator.
Jean-Baptiste-Charles Chabroud (1750–1816), a French lawyer and politician.
Laurent Mourguet (1769–1884), puppeteer.
François Ponsard (1814–1867) a French dramatist, poet and author.
Louis Vialleton (1859-1929) a French zoologist and writer.
Fernand Point (1897–1955), chef.

Twin towns – sister cities

Vienne is twinned with:

Albacete, Spain
Esslingen am Neckar, Germany
Greenwich, United States
Goris, Armenia
Neath Port Talbot, Wales, United Kingdom
Piotrków Trybunalski, Poland
Schiedam, Netherlands
Udine, Italy
Velenje, Slovenia

References

Martial, Epigrams, 7.78
Strabo, Geography, 4.1.10

External links
 Livius.org: Roman Vienne - historical information and pictures
 Official website (in French)

Communes of Isère
Subprefectures in France
Allobroges
Pontius Pilate
Dauphiné
Populated places on the Rhône
Populated riverside places in France
People from Vienne, Isère